The Mombasa woodpecker (Campethera mombassica) is a species of bird in the family Picidae.
It is found in Kenya, Somalia, and Tanzania.

References

Mombasa woodpecker
Birds of East Africa
Mombasa woodpecker
Taxonomy articles created by Polbot
Northern Zanzibar–Inhambane coastal forest mosaic